Ashoverite is one of three polymorphs of zinc hydroxide, Zn(OH)2. It is a rare mineral first found in a limestone quarry near Ashover, Derbyshire, England, in 1988. It has also been found in the Harz mountain range in Germany, and in Namibia.

The mineral was discovered after samples of the polymorph sweetite were sent to labs by S. A. Rust. Some specimens contained what appeared to be baryte but, which on further examination, were found to be a previously undescribed mineral.

References

Handbook of Mineralogy
Ashoverite Mineral Data, webmineral.com
Mindat.org

Zinc minerals
Hydroxide minerals
Tetragonal minerals
Minerals in space group 141
Polymorphism (materials science)
Minerals described in 1988